Zakhireh-ye Esmail Ghanom (also Romanized as Z̄akhīreh-ye Esma‘il Ghānom; also known as Mālek-e Ashtar, Z̄akhīreh, Z̄akhīreh-ye Esma‘il Khānom, and Zakhire-ye Esmā‘īl Khānom) is a village in Shavur Rural District, Shavur District, Shush County, Khuzestan Province, Iran. At the 2006 census, its population was 1,659, in 278 families.

References 

Populated places in Shush County